Spurs and Saddles is a 1927 American silent Western film directed by Clifford Smith and written by Harrison Jacobs. The film stars Art Acord, Fay Wray, William J. Dyer, J. Gordon Russell, C.E. Anderson and Monte Montague. The film was released on July 17, 1927, by Universal Pictures.

Cast     
 Art Acord as Jack Marley
 Fay Wray as Mildred Orth
 William J. Dyer as Bud Bailey
 J. Gordon Russell as 'Blaze' Holton
 C.E. Anderson as Hawk
 Monte Montague as Stage Driver
 Raven the Horse as Buddy

References

External links
 

1927 films
1927 Western (genre) films
Universal Pictures films
Films directed by Clifford Smith
American black-and-white films
Silent American Western (genre) films
1920s English-language films
1920s American films